Jangladesh, also known as Janglu, was a historical region in north, north-western and north-eastern Rajasthan state in northern India. It included the present-day districts of Bikaner, Churu, Ganganagar, and Hanumangarh.
It was bounded on the south by Marwar and Jaisalmer regions, on the east by Ajmer-Merwara region.

History
The north-eastern and north-western Rajasthan, known by the name Jangladesh in ancient times, was inhabited by Jat clans ruled by their own chiefs and largely governed by their own customary law.

Most of Jat clans in Rajasthan had to accept Rathore suzerainty due to Rao Bika's invasion of Jangladesh. Bika led an army of 300 Rajput warriors and subjugated all of the Jat clans of northern Rajasthan. Bika also saved the Jats from the Bhati Rajputs and acted as their buffer. The Godara Jats and Charans were loyal supporters of Bika.

See also
Rajasthani people

References

History of Rajasthan